Stoke Trister is a village and civil parish  south-east of Wincanton and  north-west of Gillingham close to the Dorset border in the South Somerset district of Somerset, England. The parish includes the hamlet of Bayford.

History
The Stoke part of the name means place or dairy farm with the Trister part being a corruption of the name of Richard del Estre who was lord of the manor in the 12th century. Stoke Trister passed with Cucklington to the Phelips family in 1765 and was then held with Montacute.

The parish of Stoke Trister was part of the Norton Ferris Hundred.

The manor house, which was built in the 16th century, is now Stoke Farm House. It was acquired around 1547 by the Earl of Pembroke and sold in 1602.

Physicwell House, which was formerly known as Horwood Well House was built around 1805.

Governance
The parish council has responsibility for local issues, including setting an annual precept (local rate) to cover the council’s operating costs and producing annual accounts for public scrutiny. The parish council evaluates local planning applications and works with the local police, district council officers, and neighbourhood watch groups on matters of crime, security, and traffic. The parish council's role also includes initiating projects for the maintenance and repair of parish facilities, as well as consulting with the district council on the maintenance, repair, and improvement of highways, drainage, footpaths, public transport, and street cleaning. Conservation matters (including trees and listed buildings) and environmental issues are also the responsibility of the council.

The village falls within the Non-metropolitan district of South Somerset, which was formed on 1 April 1974 under the Local Government Act 1972, having previously been part of Wincanton Rural District. The district council is responsible for local planning and building control, local roads, council housing, environmental health, markets and fairs, refuse collection and recycling, cemeteries and crematoria, leisure services, parks, and tourism.

Somerset County Council is responsible for running the largest and most expensive local services such as education, social services, libraries, main roads, public transport, policing and  fire services, trading standards, waste disposal and strategic planning.

It is also part of the Somerton and Frome county constituency represented in the House of Commons of the Parliament of the United Kingdom. It elects one Member of Parliament (MP) by the first past the post system of election.

Religious sites
The Church of St Andrew dates from 1841 and has been designated by English Heritage as a Grade II listed building.

References

External links

 Stoke Trister at British History Online

Villages in South Somerset
Civil parishes in Somerset